Taram is language of Nigeria. It has traditionally been considered a dialect of Daka, but appears to be more divergent than that. It is poorly documented, only attested in a publication from 1931. 

Meek (1931) reported that Taram was spoken by the Daka living around the confluence of the Taraba River and the rivers Kam and Yim.

References

Northern Bantoid languages
Languages of Nigeria